Euphaea pseudodispar, the Satara torrent dart, is a species of damselfly in the family Euphaeidae. The species name pseudodispar is coined to remind its close resemblance to Euphaea dispar.

This species is endemic to the Western Ghats, known to occur only in the high-elevation streams and riparian patches of Satara district around Thoseghar in Maharashtra.

See also 
 List of odonates of India
 List of odonata of Kerala

References

External links

Euphaeidae
Insects described in 2021